Górski Las  is a settlement in the administrative district of Gmina Wilczęta, within Braniewo County, Warmian-Masurian Voivodeship, in northern Poland.

References

Villages in Braniewo County